Lasiocroton is a plant genus of the family Euphorbiaceae first described as a genus in 1859.  The genus is endemic to the West Indies. It is a member of the Leucocroton alliance, which also includes Leucocroton and Garciadelia. Species in this alliance are dioecious.

Species
 Lasiocroton bahamensis Pax & K.Hoffm. - Bahamas, Cuba, Haiti
 Lasiocroton fawcettii Urb. - Jamaica
 Lasiocroton gracilis Britton & P.Wilson - SE Cuba
 Lasiocroton gutierrezii Jestrow - Cuba
 Lasiocroton harrisii Britton - Jamaica
 Lasiocroton macrophyllus  (Sw.) Griseb. - Jamaica
 Lasiocroton microphyllus (A.Rich.) Jestrow - Cuba

formerly included
 moved to other genera (Bernardia Croton Leucocroton)
 Lasiocroton cordifolius Britton & P.Wilson - Leucocroton cordifolius (Britton & P.Wilson) Alain
 Lasiocroton prunifolius Griseb. - Croton punctatus Jacq.
 Lasiocroton subpeltatus Urb. - Leucocroton subpeltatus (Urb.) Alain
 Lasiocroton trelawniensis C.D.Adams - Bernardia trelawniensis (C.D.Adams) Jestrow & Proctor

References

Adelieae
Euphorbiaceae genera
Flora of the Caribbean
Dioecious plants